The 2022 Campeonato Paraense Finals was the final that decided the 2022 Campeonato Paraense, the 110th season of the Campeonato Paraense. The final were contested between Remo and Paysandu.

Remo defeated Paysandu 4–3 on aggregate to win their 47th Campeonato Paraense title.

Road to the final
Note: In all scores below, the score of the home team is given first.

Format
The finals were played on a home-and-away two-legged basis. If tied on aggregate, the penalty shoot-out was used to determine the winner.

Matches

First leg

Second leg

See also
2023 Copa Verde
2023 Copa do Brasil

References

Campeonato Paraense Finals